Gillies Lake is a lake in Timmins, Ontario, Canada.  It was developed by the Conservation Authority as part of its lake rejuvenation project in 1986.

The lake features a  trail, picnic facilities, interpretive storyboards, public washrooms, a boardwalk, wireless hotspots, a recreation field, a beach, sports field, playground area, and a supervised swimming area with change rooms.

See also
List of lakes in Ontario

References

Lakes of Cochrane District
Geography of Timmins